"Flying" is a single by Canadian rock singer Bryan Adams, from his album Room Service, released in 2004 (See 2004 in music).

The song reached number 39 in the UK Singles Chart, making it his 2nd UK Top 40 single from the album, and as of 2019, remains his last UK Top 40 hit.

Track listings

CD

Chart positions

References

2004 singles
2004 songs
Bryan Adams songs
Songs written by Bryan Adams
Songs written by Robert John "Mutt" Lange
Universal Music Group singles
Rock ballads